Podogymnura is a genus of mammal in the family Erinaceidae. It contains the following species:
 Dinagat moonrat (Podogymnura aureospinula)
 Eastern Mindanao gymnure (Podogymnura intermedia)
 Podogymnura minima
 Mindanao gymnure (Podogymnura truei)

References

 
Gymnures
Mammal genera
Taxa named by Edgar Alexander Mearns
Taxonomy articles created by Polbot